The Gamegun (styled GAMEGUN on its packaging) is the only light gun released for the 3DO Interactive Multiplayer video game console. It was released in 1994 by American Laser Games, developers of full motion video-based shooter games. The Gamegun is styled exactly like the Peacekeeper Revolver, except with a notable color difference.  The peripheral came in two versions: one player and two-player. The only difference between the two is that the two-player version, which was released in 1995, came with an attached y-connector end, allowing two players to plug in two light guns to play simultaneously. With the one player version, the gun could be daisy chained with a regular 3DO controller, allowing another player to use the gamepad at the same time.

Supported games
The Gamegun is supported by 12 games, including two arcade games that ran on 3DO hardware but were never released for the home console:
Corpse Killer
Crime Patrol
Demolition Man
Drug Wars
Fast Draw Showdown (arcade only)
Gunslinger's Collection (compilation bundling both Mad Dog games with Crime Patrol)
The Last Bounty Hunter
Mad Dog McCree
Mad Dog II: The Lost Gold
Shootout at Old Tucson (arcade only)
Space Pirates
Who Shot Johnny Rock

References

Light guns
3DO Interactive Multiplayer